The Inter-California Railway, known in Spanish as the Ferrocarril Inter-California, also known as the Inter-Cal, is a former railroad line which connected the Californias by train. It operated between the American state of California and the Mexican state of Baja California.

History
The Inter-California Railway was incorporated on 15 June 1904, as a subsidiary of Southern Pacific Railroads.

In 1929, the Mexicali and Gulf Railway was reorganized as the southern line of Inter-Cal.

Inter-Cal's lines in Mexico became the Ferrocarril Sonora-Baja California in 1960.

Lines

Main line
The Inter-California Railway's northern terminus was in Niland, California, where the line connected to the Sunset line of Southern Pacific Railroads. The Inter-Cal then continued down through the Imperial Valley until Calexico, California, just north of the United States-Mexico border. From Calexico, the Inter-Cal crossed the border into Mexicali, Baja California and then continued through the Mexicali Valley, before crossing the border again at Los Algodones, Baja California and finally terminating at Araz Junction in Andrade, California, where the line reconnected to the Sunset line.

References

See also
List of defunct railroads of North America

Transportation in the Californias
Inter-California
Inter-California
History of Baja California
History of California
Transportation in Baja California
Transportation in California
Railway companies disestablished in 1948